Junior Amour Loussoukou Ngouala (born 5 December 1996) is a Congolese international footballer who plays as a midfielder for Águilas FC and captains the Congo national team.

Career
Born in Brazzaville, he has played club football for ACNFF, CARA Brazzaville, CSMD Diables Noirs and Stade Tunisien.

At the youth level he played in the 2011 FIFA U-17 World Cup, the 2013 African U-17 Championship and 2015 African U-20 Championship qualifiers. He made his senior international debut for Congo in 2017.

References

External links
 

1996 births
Living people
Republic of the Congo footballers
Republic of the Congo international footballers
Republic of the Congo youth international footballers
ACNFF players
CARA Brazzaville players
CSMD Diables Noirs players
Stade Tunisien players
Tunisian Ligue Professionnelle 1 players
Association football midfielders
Republic of the Congo expatriate footballers
Republic of the Congo expatriate sportspeople in Tunisia
Expatriate footballers in Tunisia
Sportspeople from Brazzaville
Republic of the Congo under-20 international footballers
Águilas FC players
Republic of the Congo expatriate sportspeople in Spain
Expatriate footballers in Spain
Segunda Federación players
Republic of the Congo A' international footballers
2018 African Nations Championship players